Taylor Zakhar Perez (born December 24, 1991) is an American actor popularly known for portraying Marco Valentin Peña in The Kissing Booth 2.

Early life
Perez was born in Chicago on December 24, 1991, and grew up in Chesterton, Indiana. He attended Chesterton High School, where he was a swimmer. Perez is of Middle Eastern, Mediterranean and Mexican descent.

His mother is an aesthetician and he is the third youngest of eight children. He earned a swimming scholarship to Fordham University, but turned it down to attend UCLA where he majored in Spanish, Culture and Community with a minor in TV and Films.

Perez started by performing musicals in opera houses at an early age. Modelling came next and he moved to Los Angeles. He took photos in his room with a sheet as backdrop and sent them in manila envelopes with self tapes.

Career
Perez began his career by appearing in various popular shows like iCarly, Suburgatory, Young & Hungry, Code Black and Scandal.

In 2020, Perez played Marco Valentin Peña in Netflix's The Kissing Booth 2 opposite Joey King. For his role, he took choreography and guitar lessons. In 2021, he reprised the role in the third film The Kissing Booth 3.

In 2022, Perez starred in HBO Max's comedy series Minx as Shane Brody. He then starred in gaming comedy film 1Up as Dustin. Perez will also headline Amazon Prime Video's Red, White & Royal Blue as Alex Claremont-Diaz opposite Nicholas Galitzine.

Philanthropy
At the start of the COVID-19 pandemic, Perez partnered with Variant Malibu, a 3D tech company to make masks. They cut 90% of traditional manufacturing waste. He also designed  his own masks with The Kissing Booth 2 co-stars Joel Courtney, Joey King, Meganne Young and Maisie Richardson-Sellers. The proceeds from his masks went to a Chicago organisation that helps disabled kids, adults and families with disabled kids in the Hispanic community.

"I really like digging my heels into one social issue and being like, 'This is what I know. This is what I'm learning.' And maybe the people that follow me will have read everything along the way and understood it," said Perez.

Filmography

Films

Television

References

External links
 

Living people
1991 births
American film actors
American male film actors
American male actors of Mexican descent
American people of Lebanese descent
American television actors
American male television actors
21st-century American male actors